The following is a list of notable deaths in October 1993.

Entries for each day are listed alphabetically by surname. A typical entry lists information in the following sequence:
 Name, age, country of citizenship at birth, subsequent country of citizenship (if applicable), reason for notability, cause of death (if known), and reference.

October 1993

1
Fran Bošnjaković, 91, Croatian engineer and thermodynamicist.
Janine Darcey, 76, French film actress.
Raymond Bryan Dillard, 49, American theologian and biblical scholar, heart attack.
Božo Janković, 42, Yugoslav football player.
Sigurð Joensen, 82, Faroese lawyer, author, and politician.
M. Vera Peters, 82, Canadian oncologist, breast cancer.
Hermann Otto Sleumer, 87, Dutch botanist.
Segundo Castillo Varela, 80, Peruvian football player.
Giuseppe Vari, 69, Italian film director, editor and screenwriter.

2
Ahmed Abdul-Malik, 66, American jazz double bassist and oud player.
William Berger, 65, Austrian-American actor, cancer.
Henry Ringling North, 83, American businessman and circus owner.
Amin Tarif, 95, Israeli Druze religious leader.

3
Katerina Gogou, 53, Greek poet, author and actress, suicide.
Gary Gordon, 33, American Army master sergeant and recipient of the Medal of Honor, killed in action.
Mihály Korom, 65, Hungarian politician and jurist.
Patricia Lake, 74, American actress, radio comedian , and socialite.
Rory Peck, 36, Northern-Irish freelance war cameraman, shot.
Randy Shughart, 35, American Army Delta Force soldier and recipient of the Medal of Honor, killed in action.

4
John Cawas, 83, Indian actor and stuntman.
Varetta Dillard, 60, American rhythm and blues singer.
Jim Holton, 42, Scottish football player, heart attack.
William Henry Scott, 72, American teacher and historian.
Lorie Tarshis, 82, Canadian economist.

5
Francesco Carpino, 88, Italian Roman Catholic Cardinal and Archbishop.
Willard A. Hanna, 82, American writer.
Karl Gordon Henize, 66, American astronomer and astronaut, heart attack
Radhu Karmakar, 74, Indian cinematographer and film director.
Jane Nigh, 68, American actress, stroke.
Dumitru Stăniloae, 89, Romanian Orthodox Christian priest and theologian.

6
Sergei Babkov, 72, Soviet and Russian painter.
Albert Bigelow, 87, American writer and pacifist.
Ray Broussard, 56, American thoroughbred horse racing jockey .
Stillman Drake, 82, Canadian historian and academic.
Nejat Eczacıbaşı, 80, Turkish industrialist and philanthropist
Victor Razafimahatratra, 72, Malagasy Roman Catholic cardinal.

7
Ivor Bulmer-Thomas, 87, British journalist and scientific writer.
Cyril Cusack, 82, Irish actor (Nineteen Eighty-Four, Harold and Maude, My Left Foot), complications from amyotrophic lateral sclerosis.
Agnes de Mille, 88, American dancer and choreographer, stroke.
Kenneth Nelson, 63, American actor (The Boys in the Band, Hellraiser, Seventeen).

8
Gu Cheng, 37, Chinese poet, essayist and novelist, suicide.
Pete Cooper, 78, American golfer.
Santiago Navarro, 56, Spanish basketball player.
Manke Nelis, 73, Dutch levenslied  singer.
Alfred Toepfer, 99, German entrepreneur.

9
Bernard J. Ganter, 65, American prelate of the Roman Catholic Church.
Harry Jagielski, 61, American gridiron football player.
Sachiko Murase, 88, Japanese actress.
Göta Pettersson, 66, Swedish gymnast and Olympian.
C. R. Rangachari, 77, Indian cricket player.

10
John Bindon, 50, English actor and bodyguard, cancer.
Catherine Collard, 46, French classical pianist, cancer.
Jim Howden, 59, Australian rower and Olympian, cancer.
Keith Murray, Baron Murray of Newhaven, 90, British academic.

11
Joe Barzda, 78, American racing driver.
Nani Bhattacharya, 75, Indian trade union activist and politician.
Alexandra Hay, 46, American actress.
Yvar Mikhashoff, 52, American pianist and composer, AIDS-related complications.
Andy Stewart, 59, Scottish musician, heart attack.
Jess Thomas, 66, American operatic tenor.
Lee Walls, 60, American baseball player.

12
Leon Ames, 91, American actor (Meet Me in St. Louis, Tora! Tora! Tora!, Mister Ed), stroke.
Mircea David, 78, Romanian football player.
Lawrence R. Hafstad, 89, American electrical engineer and physicist.
Ruth Gilbert, 81, American actress, brain cancer.
Patrick Holt, 81, English actor.
Myrtle Lind, 95, American film actress.
V. Subbiah, 82, Indian communist politician.
Pendekanti Venkatasubbaiah, 72, Indian politician.

13
Tekin Arıburun, 88, Turkish soldier and statesman.
Espectro I, 54, Mexican luchador known as "El Espectro I" ("The Ghost").
Wade Flemons, 53, American soul singer, cancer.
Otmar Gutmann, 56, German filmmaker, cancer.
John G. Jackson, 86, American lecturer, teacher and writer.
Gwen Welles, 42, American actress, cancer.

14
Joseph S. Ammerman, 69, American politician.
Nikolay Baskakov, 75, Soviet and Russian painter.
Bertie Clarke, 75, Barbadian cricket player.
Harald Hennum, 65, Norwegian football player.
Hirohide Ishida, 78, Japanese politician.
Walter Newman, 77, American radio writer and screenwriter.
Venmani S. Selvanather, 80, Indian prelate of the Roman Catholic Church.
Obert C. Tanner, 89, American businessman and philanthropist.

15
Clarence Lung, 78, American actor.
Aydın Sayılı, 80, Turkish historian of science.
Dan Turèll, 47, Danish writer, esophageal cancer.
Satosi Watanabe, 83, Japanese theoretical physicist.

16
Jimmie DeShong, 83, American baseball player.
Flora Nwapa, 62, Nigerian author, pneumonia.
Arnie Oliver, 86, American soccer player.
Bonnie Poe, 81, American actress and voice artist.
René Sylviano, 89, French composer.

17
Syed Mohammad Ali, 64, Bangladeshi journalist and editor.
Vijay Bhatt, 86, Indian film director and screenwriter.
Helmut Gollwitzer, 84,  German Lutheran theologian and author.
Gordon Grieve, 81, New Zealand politician.
Criss Oliva, 30, American musician, traffic collision.
Bill Reigel, 61, American basketball player and coach.

18
Bernd Baselt, 59, German musicologist.
Maria Rosa Candido, 26, Italian short track speed skater and Olympian, traffic collision.
Lois Kibbee, 71, American actress (The Edge of Night, Caddyshack, One Life to Live), brain cancer.
Salvador P. Lopez, 82, Filipino writer, journalist, diplomat and statesman.

19
Gidske Anderson, 71, Norwegian journalist and author.
Pola Illéry, 83, Romanian-American actress and singer.
John Kerr, 94, American baseball player.
Carsta Löck, 90, German film actress.

20
Aage Dons, 90, Danish author.
Gaylord DuBois, 94, American comic book writer.
Milan Konjović, 95, Serbian painter.
Bob Olderman, 31, American gridiron football player.
Yasushi Sugiyama, 84, Japanese painter.

21
Wayne Belardi, 63, American baseball player.
James Leo Herlihy, 66, American author (Midnight Cowboy) and playwright, suicide.
Bob Hunter, 80, American sportswriter.
Melchior Ndadaye, 40, Burundian intellectual and politician, murdered.
Annie Thayyil, 74, Indian novelist, journalist, and biographer.
Irv Torgoff, 76, American basketball player, heart attack.
Sam Zolotow, 94, American theater critic, stomach cancer.

22
Jiří Hájek, 80, Czech politician and diplomat.
Innes Ireland, 63, British military officer and racing driver, cancer.
Said Mohamed Jaffar, 75, President of Comoros (1975-1976).
Luis Felipe Ramón y Rivera, 80, Venezuelan musician, composer and writer.
Hans Walter Wolff, 81, German protestant theologian.

23
Thomas Begley, 22, Northern Irish IRA Volunteer, bomb explosion.
Ulf Björlin, 60, Swedish composer and conductor.
Friedrich Dickel, 79, German politician.
Wilhelm Feldberg, 92, German-British physiologist and biologist.
Shota Lomidze, 57, Georgian wrestler and Olympian.

24
Jo Grimond, 80, British politician.
Přemysl Hajný, 67, Czechoslovak ice hockey player.
Hajibaba Huseynov, 74, Soviet and Azerbaijani poet and pedagogue.
Fritz Jüptner-Jonstorff, 85, Austrian art director.
Heinz Kubsch, 63, German football goalkeeper.
Tonino Nardi, 54, Italian film cinematographer.
Elena Nicolai, 88, Bulgarian operatic mezzo-soprano.

25
Danny Chan, 35, Hong Kong singer, songwriter, records producer and actor.
Mariya Kapnist, 80, Soviet and Ukrainian actress, complications following car accident.
Roy Hampton Park, 83, American media executive and entrepreneur.
Vincent Price, 82, American actor (House of Wax, The Fly, Edward Scissorhands), lung cancer.

26
Maurice Henry Dorman, 81, British diplomat and colonial administrator.
František Filipovský, 86, Czechoslovak actor.
Albert Hyzler, 76, Maltese politician and President of Malta.
Oro, 21, Mexican professional wrestler, wrestling accident.
Harold Rome, 85, American composer, lyricist, and musical writer.
Mušan Topalović, 36, Bosnian gangster and warlord, killed.
Albert Zugsmith, 83, American film producer, film director and screenwriter.

27
Earl Banks, 69, American gridiron football player and coach, car accident.
Cloyce Box, 70, American gridiron football player.
David Lawrence McKay, 92, American Mormon leader.
Peter Quennell, 88, English writer, biographer, and literary historian.
Peter Tizard, 77, British paediatrician and university professor.

28
Emilio Berio, 88, Italian entomologist and lawyer.
Doris Duke, 80, American heiress, philanthropist, art collector, and socialite, edema.
Cal Koonce, 52, American baseball player, lymphoma.
Juri Lotman, 71, Russian-Estonian literary scholar, semiotician, and historian.
Bob Seeds, 86, American baseball player.

29
Lipman Bers, 79, Latvian-American mathematician.
Robert P. Dilworth, 78, American mathematician.
Herbert Lütkebohmert, 45, German football player.
Masahiro Makino, 85, Japanese film director.
Stanisław Marusarz, 80, Polish Nordic skiing competitor and Olympian.
Edie Parker, 71, American author and first wife of writer Jack Kerouac.
Zdeněk Podskalský, 70, Czech film director and screenwriter.
George Pope, 82, English cricket player.
Elliot Scott, 78, English production designer (Who Framed Roger Rabbit, Labyrinth, Indiana Jones and the Last Crusade).
František Tokár, 68, Czechoslovak table tennis player.
Roger Turner, 92, American figure skater and Olympian.

30
Donald Prentice Booth, 90, American Army general.
Paul Grégoire, 82, Canadian Roman Catholic cardinal, stomach cancer.
Louis B. Heller, 88, American lawyer and politician.
Peter Kemp, 78, English soldier and writer.
Maria Matray, 86, German screenwriter and film actress.
Margaret Vyner, 78, Australian-British model and actress.
Ted Williams, 77, American gridiron football player.

31
Bob Atcher, 79, American country musician.
Federico Fellini, 73, Italian film director and screenwriter (8½, La Dolce Vita, La Strada), four-time Oscar winner, heart attack.
Al Mello, 87, American Olympic and boxer.
Lajos Papp, 49, Hungarian sport shooter and Olympian.
River Phoenix, 23, American actor (Running on Empty, Stand by Me, Indiana Jones and the Last Crusade) and musician, drug overdose.
Gilman Rankin, 82, American actor (Midnight Cowboy, Tombstone Territory, Assault on Precinct 13).
Edwin Walker, 83, American Army officer, anti-communist, and white supremacist, lung cancer.

References 

1993-10
 10